Samuel van den Bergh (6 April 1864, in Oss – 4 February 1941, in Nice) was one of the main European Jewish margarine and soap manufacturers in the early 20th century.

In 1888, the year his father, Simon van den Bergh, opened his first German margarine factory in Kleve, van den Bergh joined his father's margarine company, of which he became general director in 1909 after his father's death in 1907. He was initially in fierce competition with another manufacturer from Oss, Netherlands, named Antonius Johannes Jurgens, whose grandfather, Antoon Jurgens, had founded the first margarine factory in the world in 1870 in Oss by "using" a French patent and operated another German factory in nearby Goch.  Both competitors merged in 1927 to form the Margarine Unie in Rotterdam (which would merge in 1930 with Lever Brothers to form Unilever).

References

Further reading 
 Charles Wilson: The history of Unilever. A study in economic growth and social change. 2 vols. London, Cassell & Company, 1954. Ed. Cassell 1970: 

1864 births
1941 deaths
People from Oss
Liberal Union (Netherlands) politicians
Liberal State Party politicians
Members of the Senate (Netherlands)
Members of the House of Representatives (Netherlands)
Municipal councillors of Rotterdam
Dutch chief executives in the manufacturing industry
Dutch businesspeople
Dutch corporate directors
Dutch Jews
Jewish Dutch politicians
Unilever people
People in food and agriculture occupations